Jamalpur Kacharipara Akadas is a professional Bangladeshi Women's association football club from Jamalpur. It was founded on 2006. It's a team of Bangladesh Women's Football League.

History
In December 2019, the club announced that they will take part in 2019-20 Bangladesh Women's League, the top tier professional women's football league of Bangladesh which is resuming after seven years.

On 23 February 2020, Jamalpur Kacharipara XI played their first match against Cumilla United.

Current squad
Jamalpur Kacharipara Akadas squad for 2021–22 season.

Club management

Current technical staff
As of November 2022

See also 

 Bashundhara Kings Women
FC Brahmanbaria Women
Nasrin Sporting Club 
ARB College Sporting Club
Bangladesh Women's Football League

References

2019 establishments in Bangladesh
Association football clubs established in 2019
Women's football clubs in Bangladesh